Beetle Adventure Racing! is a racing game released for the Nintendo 64 in 1999. It was developed by Paradigm Entertainment along with EA Canada and published by Electronic Arts. Each vehicle in the game is a Volkswagen New Beetle, which was released the previous year.

In addition to its original release, the game was released in Australia as HSV Adventure Racing. This version replaced the Beetles with HSV VT models.

Gameplay
The gameplay is similar to Electronic Arts' own Need for Speed series.

Beetle Adventure Racing supports up to four players.  Two-player races can be held in any of the tracks, provided they have been unlocked in the single-player championship. Two to four players can also take part in the "Beetle Battle" mode, a vehicular combat mode in which players compete to collect six differently colored ladybugs (HSV pendants in HSV Adventure Racing), attempt to destroy the other competitors, and race for the exit once all the ladybugs are collected.

Single-player has two modes, Single Race and Championship. Single Race is single-player racing against computer-controlled vehicles on any stage that has been unlocked in the Championship mode. The championship is considered the main game, where players are given three circuits starting with Novice, Advanced, and Professional, with a fourth secret circuit, the Bonus Circuit, which is unlocked after completing all previous circuits.

Upon completing each circuit, new vehicles and tracks will be unlocked. Two special vehicles are unlocked by completing both Professional and Bonus circuits, the Alien Beetle and the Police Beetle respectively. The Alien Beetle's horn consists of the words, "We come in peace", spoken in an alien voice. The Police Beetle uses a siren, in which all other computer racers stop and pull over upon hearing it.

Four different types of crates are scattered along each track in Championship mode. Three of them are Point Crates, which are mostly found off track in shortcuts. The points are used to earn Continues during each race, with between 50 and 70 required to get the Continue (dependent on difficulty). Finding all point crates, which add up to 100 in total, gives players a new Arena In Beetle Battle Mode.

Upon smashing through Nitro crates, the player is given a temporary boost of speed. These crates are usually found on hidden paths and beside the main roads.

The fourth crate is a Cheat Crate, hidden on each stage. Smashing one, the player would hear, "Groovy!". Smashing a Cheat crate the first time unlocks the Cheat Menu, which offers cheat codes in both Two-Player Racing and Beetle Battle. The Cheat menu has an Easter egg in which all the developers of the game have their faces scattered on the background of the menu.

Development
In the late 1990s, EA Canada partnered with Paradigm to work on an entry in the Need for Speed series for the Nintendo 64. Need for Speed 64 would have exclusive tracks and vehicles, Rumble Pak support and the series' trademark gameplay mechanics. The game was cancelled after Electronic Arts signed a deal with Volkswagen to make a game around the New Beetle, in addition to the designers looking for something else to distinguish it from other racers, thus altering the project into Beetle Adventure Racing!.

The soundtrack is groovy breakbeat, featuring drums, organs, and guitars. The music was composed by Phil Western, Scott Blackwood, and Brenden Tennant.

Reception

Beetle Adventure Racing received "universal acclaim" according to the review aggregation website Metacritic. In Japan, where the game was ported and published by Square EA on November 26, 1999, Famitsu gave it a score of 28 out of 40.

An unnamed reviewer of Next Generation wrote: "While it seems like every other title coming out for N64 is a racer, there are surprisingly few really good ones. Beetle Adventure Racing not only emerges as one of the best, but its level design will also serve as a watermark that other franchises like Top Gear and even EA's own Need for Speed will have to live up to".

Victor Lucas of The Electric Playground wrote: "Although the repetitiveness that comes from having only one style of vehicle to race with is a bit of a drag, I have to say that the modeling of the bugs has been well handled. [...] The scenery around the tracks is absolutely stunning. All of the environments in Beetle Adventure Racing feel like they're alive". Lucas noted some graphical errors and felt that the game should have utilized the system's Expansion Pak for higher resolution, but wrote: "Still, all of the tracks are long, intense and littered with discovery. I couldn't bring myself to complain too loudly. The music and sound effects of Beetle Adventure Racing are so perfectly suited to the gameplay it's almost as if the audio was built first and the gameplay was designed around it". Lucas concluded that "Beetle Adventure Racing is the first truly addictive Nintendo 64 game of 1999".

Peer Schneider of IGN heavily praised the game's graphics, sound effects, detailed racing tracks, vehicle handling, and multiplayer mode, but wrote that "one of the game's strongest sales points is also its Achilles' Heel. Make no mistake about it -- the Beetles are cool and deliver all the speed and handling you'd want, but what if EA had gone for a multi-car license as with Need for Speed? We can only imagine how cool it would have been to compete for a Lotus or a Ferrari instead of another VW Bug. At the very least, EA could have included the classic Beetle model or a few other VW cars. The relatively limited number of tracks and cars is actually our only serious complaint". Schneider also wrote: "Unfortunately, the music is limited to generic 'drum and bass' tracks. It's not that it's bad, it just doesn't fit most of the tracks and there is hardly any bass to be heard..." Schneider concluded: "Aside from Wave Race, this is definitely the best racer on N64 yet. [...] Beetle Adventure Racing arrives as a breath of fresh air in a genre that hasn't moved forward in years".

Shawn Sackenheim of AllGame praised the game's lengthy racetracks, its multiplayer mode, its "superb" use of various shortcuts, and wrote: "Visually, the game is exceptional with tons of personality in the car models, tracks, and overall presentation. [...] Soaking in all the graphic detail is something your eyes will thank you for--a breathtaking look at the Nintendo 64's true power! [...] There's just so much to cover in this game that it's hard to condense it to even a lengthy review without leaving so much out! [...] Some of the brightest and most vibrant graphics on the system! Nice bouncy tunes, but they repeat after only a few minutes. Great effects and minimal voice samples round out the package". GameSpot claimed the game is a "great deal of fun".

Proposed sequel
A Beetle Adventure Racing II was in development, but has never been released.

See also
 Beetle Crazy Cup

References

External links
 

1999 video games
Electronic Arts games
Nintendo 64 games
Nintendo 64-only games
Racing video games
Volkswagen Beetle
Multiplayer and single-player video games
Advergames
Video games developed in the United States
Paradigm Entertainment games